The 1986 Swedish motorcycle Grand Prix was the tenth round of the 1986 Grand Prix motorcycle racing season. It took place on the weekend of 9–10 August at the Scandinavian Raceway.

Classification

500 cc

References

Swedish motorcycle Grand Prix
Swedish
Motorcycle
Swedish motorcycle Grand Prix